Tim Buckley (born September 10, 1963) is an American college basketball coach.

Buckley was the head men's basketball coach at Ball State University from 2000 to 2006. He is best known for leading the Cardinals to upset wins over #3 Kansas and #4 UCLA during the 2001 Maui Invitational.  Buckley was an assistant coach at the University of Iowa under Steve Alford, who left the Hawkeyes to take the head coaching job at the New Mexico Lobos. Buckley was an assistant coach at Marquette University where he is reunited with former Ball State player and 2006 MAC Freshman of the Year Maurice Acker, who transferred after Buckley was fired. Most recently Buckley spent the last 9 seasons serving as the top assistant and associate head coach for Tom Crean at Indiana University.

Buckley has also served as an assistant coach at Bemidji State (1986–88), Rockford College (1988–89, head coach 1989–93), Wisconsin (1993–94), Ball State (1994–99), Marquette (1999–2000), Iowa (2006–07), back to Marquette (2007–08), and at Indiana University (2008–2017).

Personal life 
Tim graduated from Aurora Central Catholic High School (Aurora, Illinois) in 1981 and went on to play two seasons at Waubonsee Community College before transferring to Bemidji State. He graduated with a B.S. in Communications from the latter in 1986, and also received an M.S. in Admin. of Physical Education in 1988. He is married to Shannon and has one daughter, Meredith.

Head coaching record

References

External links
 Indiana profile

1963 births
Living people
American men's basketball players
Ball State Cardinals men's basketball coaches
Basketball coaches from Illinois
Basketball players from Illinois
Bemidji State Beavers men's basketball coaches
Bemidji State Beavers men's basketball players
Indiana Hoosiers men's basketball coaches
Iowa Hawkeyes men's basketball coaches
Junior college men's basketball players in the United States
Marquette Golden Eagles men's basketball coaches
Rockford Regents men's basketball coaches
Wisconsin Badgers men's basketball coaches